Pawłowski (feminine: Pawłowska; plural: Pawłowscy) is a Polish surname derived from the given name Paweł (Paul). In some cases, it is a noble surname derived from villages named Pawłowo. It is ranked about 20th in the list of the most common Polish surnames, with more than 50,000 carriers. It is popular especially in the mid-northern part of the country.

People 
 Artur Pawlowski, Polish-Canadian street preacher and right-wing activist
 Bartłomiej Pawłowski, Polish footballer
 Bogumił Pawłowski (1898-1971), Polish botanist
 Chris Pavlovski, Rumble (website) founder
 Daniel Pawłowski (1627-1673), Jesuit preacher and writer
 Dariusz Pawłowski, Polish footballer
 Ed Pawlowski, American politician
 Felix W. Pawlowski of the Early Birds of Aviation
 Frank Pawlowski, American politician
 Jan Romeo Pawlowski (born 1960), Polish archbishop, diplomat 
 John Pawlowski (born 1963), American baseball coach
 Jerzy Pawłowski (1932-2005), Polish fencer
 Katarzyna Pawłowska (born 1989), Polish cyclist
 Łukasz Pawłowski (born 1983), Polish rower
 Mauro Pawlowski (born 1971), Belgian musician
 Monika Pawłowska (born 1983), Polish politician
 Piotr Pawłowski (born 1959), Polish canoer
 Ryszard Pawłowski (born 1950), Polish mountain climber
 Sylwester Pawłowski (born 1958), Polish politician
 Szymon Pawłowski (born 1978), Polish politician
 Szymon Pawłowski (born 1986), Polish footballer
 Tadeusz Pawłowski (born 1953), Polish football player and manager
 Wladimir von Pawlowski (1891-1961), Austrian Nazi politician
 Wojciech Pawłowski, Polish footballer

Polish-language surnames